Giovanni Costa (1901 – 1968) was an Italian footballer who played as a goalkeeper. On 20 January 1924, he represented the Italy national football team on the occasion of a friendly match against Austria in a 4–0 away loss.

References

1901 births
1968 deaths
Italian footballers
Italy international footballers
Association football goalkeepers
Spezia Calcio players
A.S.D. La Biellese players